Bjorn Haneveer (born 4 September 1976 in) is a Belgian snooker player and commentator. Haneveer, formerly a professional competitor, now plays at semi-professional level and also commentates on snooker matches for Dutch Eurosport.

Career
A six-time Belgian snooker champion (last title won in May 2007 vs Patrick Delsemme), Haneveer lost in the final of the European Championship in Scotland in June, 2000. He was European Champion at Enschede, Netherlands and at Riga, Latvia in June, 2001. Haneveer won the snooker gold medal at the sixth World Games held in Akita, Japan, in August, 2001. He made a 147 break during the 2003 European Championship at Bad Wildungen in Germany and another during the Belgian Championships, 2007. He won the bronze medal at the seventh World Games held in Germany (21 July 2005).

He was a Main Tour professional for many years, and reached a top ranking of No 53 during the 2004–05 season. Until the arrival on tour of Luca Brecel, Haneveer was by far the most successful Belgian snooker player of all time.

After falling off the main tour, he regained his place by finishing within the top 8 on the PIOS tour 2008/2009.

Haneveer announced on 9 November 2011, that he would retire from professional snooker after the PTC 9 tournament, due to excessive expenses.

Career finals

Non-ranking finals: 1 (1 title)

Pro-am finals: 12 (7 titles)

Amateur finals: 15 (10 titles)

References

External links
 
 Profile on World Snooker
 Profile on Global Snooker

1976 births
Living people
Sportspeople from Turnhout
Belgian snooker players
World Games gold medalists
World Games bronze medalists
Competitors at the 2001 World Games
Competitors at the 2005 World Games
20th-century Belgian people
21st-century Belgian people